Nikos Egonopoulos (October 21, 1907 – October 31, 1985) was a Greek painter and poet. He is one of the most important members of "Generation of the '30s", as well as a major representative of the surrealist movement in Greece. His work as a writer also includes critique and essays.

Biography

Nikos Egonopoulos was born in Athens in 1907 and was the second son of Panaghiotis and Errietti (Henrietta) Egonopoulos. During the summer of 1914, when Egonopoulos' family went on a trip to Constantinople, the family were obliged to settle there, due to the outbreak of World War I. In 1923, he was enrolled in a lycée in Paris, where he studied for a period of four years. After his return to Greece, he served as a private in the 1st Infantry Regiment. Later on, he worked as a translator in a bank and as a secretary at the University of Athens. In 1930 Egonopoulos was employed as a designer in the Urban Planning Department of the Greek Ministry of Public Works.

In 1932 he joined the Athens School of Fine Arts, where he studied under the supervision of Konstantinos Parthenis. He also attended classes at the art studio of Photios Kontoglou. During that time he met important artists, the poet Andreas Embirikos and painters such as Yannis Tsarouchis, Giorgio de Chirico and Yannis Moralis.

His first paintings, mostly temperas on paper depicting old houses, were presented at an Art of Modern Greek Tradition exhibition, organised in January 1938. Soon after the exhibition, he published translations of poems by Tristan Tzara, which were published in February. A few months later, his first collection of poems (Do Not Distract the Driver) was published, followed by a second one (The Clavicembalos of Silence) the next year.  Overall he is considered one of the finest surrealist poets of Greece.

His first individual exhibition was held in 1939. Three years later, he finished his most popular long poem Bolivar, a Greek Poem, inspired by the revolutionary leader Simón Bolívar and published in 1944. The poem was also released in the form of a song, in 1968, with music composed by Nikos Mamangakis.

He died of a heart attack in 1985 in Athens.

See also
Art in modern Greece
National Gallery of Greece

Notes

External links
Egonopoulos, official site
Poetry International Web - Article on Egonopoulos, by Haris Vlavianos. Also contains link to the full text of Bolivar.
Artist's works

1907 births
1985 deaths
Artists from Athens
Academic staff of the National Technical University of Athens
Greek surrealist writers
Modern Greek poets
Generation of the '30s
Greek surrealist artists
Surrealist poets
Arvanites
20th-century Greek poets
20th-century Greek painters
Writers from Athens